Senator Bullard may refer to:

Bill Bullard Jr. (1943–2020), Michigan State Senate
Dwight M. Bullard (born 1977), Florida State Senate
Larcenia Bullard (1947–2013), Florida State Senate